Financial Markets Authority may refer to:

 Financial Market Authority (Austria)
 Financial Market Authority (Liechtenstein)
 Financial Markets Authority (New Zealand)
 Netherlands Authority for the Financial Markets
 Qatar Financial Markets Authority
 Swiss Financial Market Supervisory Authority
 Financial Services and Markets Authority (Belgium)
 Federal Financial Supervisory Authority
 Financial Supervisory Authority (Denmark)
 Financial Market Supervisory Authority of Azerbaijan